The 10th National Film Awards, then known as State Awards for Films, presented by Ministry of Information and Broadcasting, India to felicitate the best of Indian Cinema released in 1962. Ceremony took place at Vigyan Bhavan, New Delhi on 21 April 1963 and awards were given by then President of India, Dr. Sarvepalli Radhakrishnan.

Awards 

Awards were divided into feature films and non-feature films.

President's gold medal for the All India Best Feature Film is now better known as National Film Award for Best Feature Film, whereas President's gold medal for the Best Documentary Film is analogous to today's National Film Award for Best Non-Feature Film. For children's films, Prime Minister's gold medal is now given as National Film Award for Best Children's Film. At the regional level, President's silver medal for Best Feature Film is now given as National Film Award for Best Feature Film in a particular language. Certificate of Merit in all the categories is discontinued over the years.

Feature films 

Feature films were awarded at All India as well as regional level. For the 10th National Film Awards, a Bengali film Dada Thakur won the President's gold medal for the All India Best Feature Film. Following were the awards given:

All India Award 

Following were the awards given in each category:

Regional Award 

The awards were given to the best films made in the regional languages of India.

With 10th National Film Awards, new award category was introduced for the feature films made in Punjabi language. This newly introduced category includes President's silver medal for Best Feature Film in Assamese and Certificate of Merit for second and third best film, although former was not given as no film was found suitable for the award.

For feature films in Assamese, Kannada, Malayalam, Odia and Punjabi, President's silver medal for Best Feature Film was not given, instead Certificate of Merit for Best Feature Film was awarded.

Non-Feature films 

Non-feature film awards were given for the documentaries and educational films made in the country. Following were the awards given:

Documentaries

Educational films

Awards not given 

Following were the awards not given as no film was found to be suitable for the award:

 Prime Minister's gold medal for the Best Children's Film
 Prime Minister's gold medal for the Best Educational Film
 President's silver medal for Best Feature Film in Assamese
 President's silver medal for Best Feature Film in Kannada
 President's silver medal for Best Feature Film in Malayalam
 President's silver medal for Best Feature Film in Oriya
 President's silver medal for Best Feature Film in Punjabi

References

External links 
 National Film Awards Archives
 Official Page for Directorate of Film Festivals, India

National Film Awards (India) ceremonies
1963 film awards
1963 in Indian cinema